Schistura pervagata is a species of ray-finned fish, a stone loach, in the genus Schistura. The species occurs in Laos and Vietnam in streams with moderately fast to fast currents among riffles where there are substrates which vary from gravel to stone.

References

P
Fish described in 2000